The Natural Philosophy of Love is the second studio album by the American experimental band Amber Asylum. It was released on May 20, 1997, through Release Records and Relapse Records.

Critical reception
AllMusic wrote: "Essential listening for anyone who wore nothing but black for at least one semester of high school, to be sure, but The Natural Philosophy of Love is so richly detailed and at times spine-tinglingly pretty that it's not just for recovering goths."

Track listing

References 

1997 albums
Amber Asylum albums